Glanworth GAA is a Gaelic Athletic Association club based in the parish of Glanworth, County Cork, Ireland. The club fields teams in competitions organized by the Cork GAA county board and the Avondhu GAA divisional board. The club plays under the name Glanworth in Gaelic football, and under the name Harbour Rovers in hurling. The club has traditionally been most successful in football. As of 2015, the club played in the Cork Intermediate Football Championship, and in the North Cork Premier Junior Hurling Championship.

Achievements
 Cork Intermediate Football Championship (1): 1976
 Cork Junior A Football Championship (3): 1954, 1971, 2009
 Cork Junior A Hurling Championship (0): Runners-Up 2020
 Cork Minor Football Championship (2): 1966, 1967
 Cork Minor B Hurling Championship (1): 2001
 Cork Minor C Hurling Championship (1): 2000
 North Cork Junior A Football Championship (13): 1942, 1945, 1946, 1949, 1950, 1954, 1955, 1962, 1963, 1971, 2006, 2008, 2009
 North Cork Junior A Hurling Championship (2): 2015, 2016, 2020

Notable players
 Ned Kirby - played with 1966 Cork Minor Football Team
 Donal Aherne - Captain of Cork Minor All Ireland winning Football team 1967, 1968

External links
 Glanworth GAA website

Gaelic games clubs in County Cork
Gaelic football clubs in County Cork
Hurling clubs in County Cork